Nangsal Devi Tamang (born 28 February 1987) is a Nepalese badminton player. In 2014, she competed at the Incheon Asian Games in the women's singles event but was defeated by Bellaetrix Manuputty of Indonesia in the first round. In 2016, she won the mixed doubles title at the Pakistan International tournament with her siblings Ratnajit. She also was the third place in the women's singles. After won the Pakistan International, the siblings received the Zest honours. At the national event, she plays for the Tribuvan Army Club, and at the Pushpa Lal Memorial National Open Badminton Championships, she won the women's singles and doubles event.

Achievements

South Asian Games 
Women's singles

BWF International Challenge/Series 
Women's doubles

Mixed doubles

  BWF International Challenge tournament
  BWF International Series tournament
  BWF Future Series tournament

References

External links 
 

Living people
1987 births
People from Bhojpur District, Nepal
Nepalese female badminton players
Badminton players at the 2014 Asian Games
Badminton players at the 2018 Asian Games
Asian Games competitors for Nepal
South Asian Games bronze medalists for Nepal
South Asian Games medalists in badminton